Henry William Hobhouse (8 August 1791 – 22 May 1868) was a British Whig politician.

Hobhouse was the son of Benjamin Hobhouse and Charlottee née Cam, daughter of Samuel Cam; and he was also a brother of John Hobhouse, 1st Baron Broughton. In 1814, he married Mary Anne Palmer, daughter of John Palmer, and they had at least two children: John Byron Hobhouse (1817–1842); and Sir Charles Parry Hobhouse, 3rd Baronet (1825–1916).

After unsuccessfully contesting  in 1835, Hobhouse was elected a Whig Member of Parliament for Hereford at the general election in May 1841 but resigned five months later by accepting the office of Steward of the Chiltern Hundreds.

He was also in the Honourable East India Company Service.

References

External links
 

UK MPs 1841–1847
Whig (British political party) MPs for English constituencies
1791 births
1868 deaths